Sad Café are an English rock band formed in Manchester in 1976, who achieved their peak of popularity in the late 1970s and early 1980s. They are best known for the UK top 40 singles "Every Day Hurts", "Strange Little Girl", "My Oh My" and "I'm in Love Again", the first of which was their biggest hit, reaching number 3 on the UK Singles Chart in 1979. The band also had two US Billboard Hot 100 hits with "Run Home Girl" and "La-Di-Da".

History
The group formed as a result of the unification of rock bands Mandalaband and Gyro. Its founder members were Paul Young (vocals), Ian Wilson (guitar), Vic Emerson (keyboards), Ashley Mulford (lead guitar), John Stimpson (bass) and Tony Cresswell (drums). The band took their name from the Carson McCullers novella Ballad of the Sad Cafe. Harvey Lisberg, who also managed 10cc, arranged for Eric Stewart to produce their third album, Facades (an anagram of Sad Cafe), which included the top 3 single, "Every Day Hurts".

Sad Café split up in 1990. In 1998, the group reformed with most of the 1990 lineup. However, after lead singer Paul Young's sudden death in 2000, the group disbanded once again.

Personnel

Members

Current
 Des Tong – bass, vocals (1980–1990, 1998, 2000, 2012–present)
 Dave Day - lead guitars, vocals (2018–present)
 Barry James Thomas - vocals, percussion (2018–present)
 Neil Shaw-Hulme - saxophones, wx7, vocals (2018–present)
 Matt Steele - keyboards (2019–present)
 Steve Gibson - drums (2023–present)

Former
 Paul Young – lead vocals (1976–1990, 1998; died  2000)
 Vic Emerson – keyboards (1976–1984, 2000; died 2018)
 John Stimpson – bass (1976–1980; died 2021)
 Tony Cresswell – drums (1976–1978)
 Ashley Mulford – lead guitars, vocals (1976–1981, 1986–1989, 2000, 2012–2014)
 Ian Wilson - rhythm guitar, vocals (1976-2022)
 Dave Irving - drums  (1978–1984, 2000, 2012–2019)
 Lenni – saxophone (1979–1984, 1998, 2000)
 Michael Byron-Hehir – lead guitars (1981–1984, 1989–1990, 1998; guest musician: 1986)
 Jeff Seopardi – drums (1984–1986)
 Danny Schogger – keyboards (1984)
 Phil Lanzon – keyboards (1986)
 Alistair Gordon – keyboards, vocals (1989–1990, 1998)
 Simon Waggott – keyboards, vocals (2012–2014)
 Steve Whalley – guitars, vocals (2012–2014)
 Sue Wilson-Quin - vocals (2012-2022)
 Pete Hughes - keyboards, (2018)
 Bryan Hargreaves – drums (2019–2022)
Guest musicians
 Roy Martin – drums (1998)
 Paul Burgess – drums (1986–1990)
 Steve Pigott – keyboards (1984–1986)

Lineups

Discography

Studio albums

Live albums

Compilation albums

Singles

See also
List of bands from Manchester
List of bands from England
List of performers on Top of the Pops
Swan Song Records

References

External links
 Sad Café official website
 Sad Café at Harvey Lisberg
 

English rock music groups
British soft rock music groups
Musical groups from Manchester
Musical groups established in 1976
Swan Song Records artists
A&M Records artists
RCA Records artists